{{Infobox Australian place 
| type = lga
| name     = Inverell Shire
| image    = Inverell LGA NSW.png
| caption  = Location in New South Wales
| state    = nsw
| region   = North West Slopes
| area     = 8606
| est      = 
| coordinates = 
| seat     = Inverell
| pop      = 16483
| pop_year          = 
| pop_footnotes     = 
| pop2               = 16844
| pop2_year          = 2018 est.
| pop2_footnotes     = 
| logo     = Inverell Shire Council Logo.png
| url      = http://www.inverell.nsw.gov.au
| mayor    = Paul Harmon (Unaligned)
| fedgov   = New England
| stategov = Northern Tablelands
| near-nw  = Goondiwindi (Qld)
| near-w   = Gwydir 
| near-sw  = Gwydir
| near-s   = Uralla
| near-se  = Armidale
| near-e   = Glen Innes Severn
| near-ne  = Tenterfield
| near-n   = Goondiwindi (Qld)}}

Inverell Shire is a local government area in the North West Slopes region of New South Wales, Australia adjacent to the Macintyre River and the Gwydir Highway.

The Mayor of Inverell Shire Council is Cr. Paul Harmon, who is unaligned with any political party.

History 
Inverell Shire was created on 1 July 1979 from the amalgamation of the Municipality of Inverell with Ashford Shire and Macintyre Shire.

Formerly part of Armidale Region, on 1 July 2019, Tingha was transferred to the Inverell Shire.

Main towns and villages 
The shire includes the town of Inverell and small towns and villages including Gilgai, Stannifer, Elsmore, Bukkulla, Ashford, Bonshaw, Yetman, Wallangra, Graman, Oakwood, Delungra, Mount Russell and Tingha. The locality of Myall Creek is split being Inverell Shire and Gwydir Shire.

Demographics
Aboriginal and Torres Strait Islander people made up 6.5 per cent of the population which is approximately two-and-a-half times above both the national and state averages of 2.5 per cent. The median age of people in the Inverell Shire was 41 years; slightly higher than the national median of 37 years. Children aged 0 – 14 years made up 21.3 per cent of the population and people aged 65 years and over made up 19.2 per cent of the population. Of people in the area aged 15 years and over, 51.3 per cent were married and 11.8 per cent were either divorced or separated.

Between the 2001 census and the 2011 census the Inverell Shire experienced nominal population growth in both absolute and real terms. When compared with total population growth of Australia for the same periods, being 5.78 per cent and 8.32 per cent respectively, population growth in the Inverell local government area was significantly lower than the national average. The median weekly income for residents within the Inverell Shire was significantly below the national average.

At the 2011 census, the proportion of residents in the Inverell local government area who stated their ancestry as Australian or Anglo-Saxon exceeded 88 per cent of all residents (national average was 65.2 per cent). In excess of 68 per cent of all residents in the Inverell Shire nominated a religious affiliation with Christianity at the 2011 census, which was higher than the national average of 50.2 per cent. Meanwhile, as at the census date, compared to the national average, households in the Inverell local government area had a significantly lower than average proportion (3.2 per cent) where two or more languages are spoken (national average was 20.4 per cent); and a significantly higher proportion (94.5 per cent) where English only was spoken at home (national average was 76.8 per cent).

Selected historical census data

Council

Current composition and election method
Inverell Shire Council is composed of nine councillors elected proportionally as a single ward. All councillors are elected for a fixed four-year term of office. The mayor is elected by the councillors at the first meeting of the council. The most recent election was held on 10 September 2016, and the makeup of the council is as follows:

The current Council, elected in 2012, in order of election, is:

References 

 
Local government areas of New South Wales
New England (New South Wales)
1979 establishments in Australia